Nasrabad Rural District may refer to:
 Nasrabad Rural District (Kermanshah Province)
 Nasrabad Rural District (Taft County), Yazd province